The 2016 New Jersey Democratic presidential primary  was held on June 7 in the U.S. state of New Jersey as one of the Democratic Party's primaries ahead of the 2016 presidential election.

The Democratic Party's primaries in California, Montana, New Mexico and South Dakota were held the same day, as were Republican primaries in the same five states, including their own New Jersey primary. Additionally, the Democratic Party held North Dakota caucuses the same day.

Clinton had won the state eight years prior and had support from most of the state's Democratic Congressional delegation, including Senator Cory Booker. Feeling confident about her chances in the primary, Clinton cancelled campaign events in the state in favor of delegate-rich California ahead of the primary.

Opinion polling

Results

Results by county
Hillary Clinton won every county except for Sussex and Warren.

Analysis

With its coalition of African Americans, Hispanic/Latinos, and college-educated, affluent Caucasian progressive/liberal professionals, New Jersey was seen as a state Clinton would win in the final batch of primaries on June 7. Having won the state eight years earlier against Barack Obama, Clinton managed a 26-point-routing against Bernie Sanders in 2016 despite the Sanders campaign's efforts in the state. She carried all counties in the Garden State but two, winning large victories in the cities of Newark, Trenton, and Atlantic City.

References

New Jersey
Democratic primary
2016